Sabayon Linux or Sabayon (formerly RR4 Linux and RR64 Linux), was an Italian Gentoo-based Linux distribution created by Fabio Erculiani and the Sabayon development team. Sabayon followed the "out of the box" philosophy, aiming to give the user a wide number of applications ready to use and a self-configured operating system.

Sabayon Linux featured a rolling release cycle, its own software repository and a package management system called Entropy. Sabayon was available in both x86 and AMD64 distributions and there was support for ARMv7 in development for the BeagleBone.

It was named after an Italian dessert, zabaione, which is made from eggs. Sabayon's logo was an impression of a chicken foot. In November 2020 it was announced that future Sabayon Linux versions would base on Funtoo instead of Gentoo Linux. Sabayon Linux would hence be rebranded to MocaccinoOS.

Editions

Since version 4.1, Sabayon had been released in two different flavors featuring either the GNOME or KDE desktop environments, with the ultralight Fluxbox environment included as well. (In the previous versions all three environments were included in a DVD ISO image).

Since Sabayon's initial release, additional versions of Sabayon have added other X environments, including Xfce and LXDE. A CoreCD edition which featured a minimal install of Sabayon was released to allow the creation of spins of the Sabayon operating system; however, this was later discontinued and replaced by CoreCDX (fluxbox window manager) and Spinbase (no X environment) first and by "Sabayon Minimal" later. A ServerBase edition was released which featured a server-optimized kernel and a small footprint, but this was later discontinued and integrated into the "Sabayon Minimal".

Daily build images were available to Sabayon testers, but were released weekly to the public on the system mirrors containing stable releases. Official releases were simply DAILY versions which had received deeper testing. The adoption of Molecule led the team to change the naming system for releases.

Currently available versions are:

Derivatives

Additional X window managers could also be installed from the Sabayon repositories, such as Cinnamon and Razor-qt.

Configuration

Sabayon used the same core components as the Gentoo Linux distribution, which means it used systemd. All of the Gentoo configuration tools, such as etc-update and eselect were fully functional. Sabayon also included additional tools for automatic configuration of various system components such as OpenGL. Sabayon provided proprietary video drivers for both nVidia and ATI hardware. These are enabled if compatible hardware is found; otherwise, the default open-source drivers are used. Because of the automatic driver configuration, the compositing window manager Compiz Fusion and KWin were used for the GNOME and KDE editions, respectively. The discovery and configuration of network cards, wireless cards, and webcams was similarly automatic. Most printers were detected automatically but required specific manual configuration through the CUPS interface.

Package management

Sabayon Linux relied on two package managers. Portage was inherited from Gentoo, while Entropy was developed for Sabayon by Fabio Erculiani and others. Portage downloaded source-code and compiled it specifically for the target system, whereas Entropy managed binary files from servers. The binary tarball packages were precompiled using the Gentoo Linux unstable tree. Entropy clients then pulled these tarballs and performed the various post- and pre-compilation calls of the Gentoo ebuild to set up a package correctly. This means the system was completely binary-compatible with a Gentoo system using the same build configuration. The adoption of two package managers allowed expert users to access the full flexibility of the Gentoo system and others to easily and quickly manage software applications and updates. The Entropy software featured the ability of allowing users to help generate relevant content by voting and by attaching images, files and web links to a package.

The Rigo application browser was a GUI front-end to Entropy that was the successor to Sulfur (aka Entropy Store). Taking on a "less is more" approach, Rigo was designed to be simple and fast. During an interview with Fabio Erculiani he described Rigo as a ”Google-like” Applications Management UI. Rigo handled system updates, package searching, install/removal of packages, up/down voting of packages, and many other common Entropy tasks.

Applications

The number of applications installed by default was higher for DVD editions than for editions small enough to fit on a CD. Their selection was also tailored to the choice between GNOME, KDE, Xfce, and MATE. The XBMC environment could be run without loading the full desktop environment.

The following table summarizes the software included in GNOME, KDE, Xfce, and MATE versions:

Considerable software was also available in the main repository.

Many Microsoft Windows executables were automatically run in Wine.

Other applications included Adobe Reader, Audacity, Clementine, aMSN, Celestia, Eclipse, FileZilla, GnuCash, Google Earth, Inkscape, Kdenlive, Mozilla Firefox, Mozilla Sunbird, Mozilla Thunderbird, Nero Burning ROM, Opera, Picasa, Skype, Teamviewer, VirtualBox, Vuze and Wireshark.

Games (open-source and proprietary) included Doom 3, Eternal Lands, Nexuiz, OpenArena, Quake, Quake 2, Quake 3, Quake 4, Sauerbraten, The Battle for Wesnoth, Tremulous, Unreal, Unreal Tournament, Urban Terror, Vendetta Online, Warsow, Warzone 2100, Wolfenstein: Enemy Territory, World of Padman and Xonotic.

Installation

Gentoo's installation was generally not recommended for beginners because its package management system required users to compile source code to install packages (most distributions rely on precompiled binaries). Compiling larger programs and the base operating system could take several hours. Sabayon was considered easier to install than "pure Gentoo" because it used both the Portage package management system and its own Entropy package management, which allowed the user the option of using precompiled binary files during installation.

Although the distribution was a LiveDVD (or a LiveCD for LXDE, CoreCDX, SpinBase and ServerBase) it could be installed on a hard disk once the system was fully booted. Sabayon Linux used the Calamares installer. In previous releases, Anaconda and the Gentoo Linux Installer were used. Installation was designed to be simpler than is typical for Gentoo, which required more extensive knowledge of the operating system (particularly for the compilation of the Linux kernel). Installation took up to 30 minutes depending on the speed of the DVD drive. Those without a DVD drive could install the GNOME and KDE versions through a USB drive, which could be created with Unetbootin. A program played music during the boot process.

System requirements
 i686-compatible processor (ex. Intel Pentium II, Pentium III, Celeron, AMD Athlon, AMD Duron)
 512 MB of RAM (1 GB recommended)
 OpenGL capable 3D graphics card (mostly Nvidia, ATI (brand), Intel GMA, VIA Technologies)
 Display Data Channel capable Monitor
 Mouse and Keyboard
 DVD Drive or USB flash drive for installation
 Internet Connection Recommended
 Minimum of 12 GB of free hard disk space for KDE and GNOME. Minimum of 5 GB for the others. Recommended at least 40 GB for KDE or GNOME installations, and 15 GB for the others.

Releases

Reception 
Tux Machines reviewed Sabayon Linux in 2005. Tux Machines wrote:

Dedoimedo wrote post in 2008. Its review of Sabayon Linux:

Linux.com wrote review about Sabayon 3.4:

LWN.net reviewed Sabayon 4.0:

DistroWatch Weekly reviewed Sabayon Linux in 2009:

LinuxBSDos wrote post in 2009. Its review of Sabayon 5:

References

External links
 
 Sabayon Linux on DistroWatch
Sabayon Linux on OpenSourceFeed Gallery

Gentoo Linux derivatives
KDE
Linux distributions
Live USB
Operating system distributions bootable from read-only media
Rolling Release Linux distributions
X86-64 Linux distributions